Mirjam Kristensen (born 17 May 1978) is a Norwegian novelist and non-fiction writer. She made her literary début in 2000 with the novel Dagene er gjennomsiktige, for which she was awarded the Tarjei Vesaas' debutantpris. In 2001 she published the novel De som er ute i regnværet. She published the documentary Etter freden in 2009.

References

1978 births
People from Vest-Agder
21st-century Norwegian novelists
Living people
Norwegian non-fiction writers
Norwegian women non-fiction writers 
Norwegian women novelists
21st-century Norwegian women writers